Heterocaprella is a genus of crustaceans from the Caprellidae family. The scientific name of this genus was first published in 1976 by Arimoto.

References 

Corophiidea
Crustaceans described in 1976